Simon Heartfield (born 1962 in Nantwich, Cheshire) is a DJ, musician and record producer.

Heartfield is widely regarded as a leading exponent of electronic music both in his hometown (Portsmouth, UK) and beyond. His tracks, live performances and DJ sets incorporate elements of house, breakbeat, electro and techno amongst many other sounds.

The founding member of Portsmouth band Twelve 88 Cartel, Heartfield has gone on to release much other material including the internationally distributed Permanent Way which is also available in ringtone form.

Twelve 88 Cartel produced a number of releases between 1986 and 1991 on the Bite Back! label, home to the producer of their first EP Jim Shaw of Cranes. In 1994, Heartfield joined John Peel Session favourites the Psylons as bass player and released one album on Thunderbird Records.

From 1996 to date, Heartfield has concentrated on DJ work and solo composition, as well as on material with fellow Psylons members Keith Wyatt and Jack Packer in live electronic act Seatman Separator.  DJ sets have been in established techno clubs such as The Asylum (Soho), Technosis (at Mass, Brixton), Geushky, Phase 2, Vurt and Club 414 (Brixton, London) alongside artists such as Luke Slater, Aubrey, Umek, Alex Paterson, Billy Nasty, Dirty Bass, Justin Swales and Jason Swales.

Collaborations with fellow Techno producers Dave Saunders and Barney Pratt under the name Surefoot have found favour with Carl Cox amongst others. In 2005, Heartfield co-produced a remix of Bonemachine's single Another Day Over with Sigue Sigue Sputnik.

As well as his commercially released material on Hackpen Records, Heartfield distributes many of his own EPs and has contributed extensively to the netlabel Under Your Nose Recordings.

In the last year Heartfield has worked with London's Mixtape Records and In Deep Recordings with whom he has produced commercially distributed digital and vinyl releases.

2009 has seen the completion of a 20-minute audio-visual piece, "Permanent Way Redux" which was performed as part of the 1000 Plateaus new digital media project
and a rework of the cover version of The Kinks"See My Friends" by Brian Poole of Renaldo and the Loaf

The last live performance was a 30-minute audio visual piece "In The Lodge" which featured animation from award-winning US artist Justin Curfman.

2010 saw the release of the 14-track album Venom and Eternity.

Discography

Solo 
Lux 2.1 track contributed to Under Your Nose Vol.1 Compilation 2003
Particle track contributed to Under Your Nose Vol.2 Compilation 2004
Permanent Way album (Hackpen) 2005 
Cubular Theme track contributed to Under Your Nose Vol.3 Compilation 2006
Someday All This Is Gonna End mixed album for Under Your Nose Recordings 2006
Sublimate EP digital release for Electramento 2006
Fear Of Logic mixed album for Under Your Nose Recordings 2007
Reconsequences album (In Deep Recordings) 2007 
Broken Router remix of track by Bujuben 
Trundlewheel EP (Mixtape Germany) 2008 
Venom and Eternity album (Dust Up Records) 2010

Releases with Twelve 88 Cartel 
Sweating Furore EP – (Bite Back!)  1987
Maxim mini album – (Bite Back!) 1988
Evidence mini album – (Bite Back!) 1990
Tension Crush EP - (Bite Back!) 1991

With the Psylons
Gimp album – (Thunderbird) 1996

With Seatman Separator
Claw album (SBH) 2001
The Music of… album (SBH) 2002
Basic Electronic Principles album (SBH) 2003
Auto Suggestion album (SBH) 2004
Navigation album (SBH) 2005
Ten Minutes After The End of Gravity (SBH) 2006
Sampler EP (In Deep Recordings) 2008
Mercury Trax Volume 3 (SBH) 2009

External links 
Simon Heartfield

British techno musicians
1962 births
Living people
People from Nantwich